The Vow and covenant was an act of solidarity taken by members of the House of Commons of England (7 June 1643) and the House of Lords (9 June  1643) demonstrating Parliament's unified opposition to Charles I and willingness to prosecute the war with the King. The Vow and Covenant also demonstrates the level of personal religious devotion professed by the members of the Long Parliament at this time.

The Vow and Covenant asserts there is a "a Popish and  Plot for the Subversion of the true Protestant Reformed Religion" whereby the Parliament's forces are to be surprised and overthrown, leading to the end of liberty and the "Protestant Religion". In response to this the members of Parliament make a Vow to devote their every effort and all their resources to the opposition of the King and his "Popish" purposes. The Vow also includes a personal statement of repentance and faith.

See also
Solemn League and Covenant
Protestation Returns of 1641–1642

External links
 Full Text of Vow and Covenant

English Civil War